Xuxa só Para Baixinhos 3 - Country (also known as XSPB 3) is the twenty-fifth studio album and the eighteenth in Portuguese by singer and Brazilian presenter Xuxa, released by Som Livre on August 31, 2002, is the third album in the collection Só Para Baixinhos.

Release and reception
Xuxa só Para Baixinhos 3 - Country, was by Som Livre on August 31, 2002, in the CD and VHS version and Released on DVD shortly thereafter, was remastered and released on independent CD in 2008 in economic version. The singles were "Vamos Brincar", "Bumbum, Como É Bom Ser Lelé" and "Imitando os Animais".

XSPB 3 sold more than 1,000,000 copies, receiving gold certification. It was the most sold album in Brazil in 2002, according to the Associação Brasileira dos Produtores de Discos (ABPD). With Xuxa só Para Baixinhos 3, Xuxa won for the second consecutive time the Latin Grammy Award for Best Latin Children's Album.

Awards

Latin Grammy Awards
At the 4th Annual Latin Grammy Awards in 2002, the album received one awards:

Latin Grammy Award for Best Latin Children's Album

Track listing

Personnel
Art Direction and Production: Xuxa Meneghel
Musical production: Zé Henrique
Recorded and mixed in: Yahoo Studio Rio de Janeiro
Recording Engineers: Everson Dias and Sergio Knust
Assistants: Silvio Limeira (Silva), Paulinho Viralata e Marcos Bagalha
Mixing: Eduardo Chermont
Production assistant: Everson Dias (Vidal)

Musical credits
 Bass, Vocals and Voice on the song "Sou um Jacaré": Lelo Zaneta de Oliveira
 Guitar, Guitar and Vocals: Doca Pinheiro
 Drums and Percussion: Henrique Ferretti
 Guest Musicians:
 Guitar, Acoustic Guitar, Banjo and Steel Guitar : Rick Ferreira
 Violin and Percussion in the song "O Coelhinho Fufu": Carlos Eduardo Hack
 Keyboards and Vocals: Henrique Brasil
 Keyboards: Marcelo Lobato
 Strings: Tutuca Borba
 Alto Sax, Sax Soprano e Sax Barítono: Jorge Continentino
 Harmonica and Whistle: Milton Guedes
 Trombone: Vagner Canteiro
 Percussion: Eduardo Lyra
 Guitar and Vocals: Christiane Monteiro
 Vocals: Cidashi Castro, Gabriel Miranda e Glice de Paula
 Sound Effects: Leonardo de Souza (Mikimba) e Everson Dias (Vidal)
 Special Participations: Julia Peixoto na música "Bumbum, Como é Bom Ser Lelé" e Sasha Meneghel Sfazir na música "Vamos no Shake"
 Characters: Lelo Zaneta de Oliveira (Txutxucão, Lobo Mau e Carneirinho Maior), Carlos Eduardo Hack (Sapo, Risadas, Gato, Macaco, Bussolar, Vaca e Cachorro), Marcelo Falca (Caipira), Lelo Zaneta de Oliveira (Risadas e Fada Madrinha), Alcina Milagrez (Moça, Risadas e Carneirinho Menor), Aline Barros (Xuxinha e Carneirinho do Meio) e Carlos Gouveia (Guto)

Certifications

References

External links 
 Xuxa só para Baixinhos 3 at Discogs

2002 video albums
Xuxa albums
Xuxa video albums
Children's music albums by Brazilian artists
Latin Grammy Award for Best Latin Children's Album
Portuguese-language video albums
Portuguese-language albums
Som Livre albums